The Archaeological Museum of Corfu in Corfu, Greece was built between 1962 and 1965. The museum land was donated by the city of Corfu. Its initial purpose was to house the archaeological finds from the Temple of Artemis in Corfu. In 1994 it was expanded with the addition of two more exhibit halls that display the more recent finds at the ancient citadel of Corfu. It is located on 1 Vraila Armeni St.

Collections 

The collections of the museum include:

A collection of unknown origin.
Finds from excavations from the ancient city of Corfu.
Finds from the region of Cassiope in Corfu.
Finds from excavations in the district of Thesprotia.

The main exhibits are:
 The cenotaph of Menecrates/Menekrates.
 The Gorgon pediment from the Artemis temple of Corfu. It is the oldest stone pediment in Greece dated to 590-580 BC and is described in the New York Times review of the museum as: the finest example of Archaic temple sculpture extant.
 The Lion of Menecrates. This is the work of a famous Corinthian sculptor of the Archaic period. Dated to the end of the 7th century BC.
 The pediment of Dionysus (Bacchus). Dated to 500 BC.
The base and part of the body of a kore from the late Archaic period. It was found during the excavation of a pottery workshop in the area of Figareto.
A marble torso of Apollo. This is a copy of the original statue of "Parnopios Apollo" created by Pheidias (its type is known as the "Kassel Apollo"). Dated to the 2nd century AD.
Funerary stele of Philistion daughter of Agenos and Arpalis, with inscription: Φιλίστιον Χ[αιρε]. Δοιαί μεν δεκάδες σε τελειοτόκων ενιαυτών ήδη και τριτάτου κύκλος επείχεν έτευς μισγομένα φθιμένοιαι,  φιλίστιον, ανίκα πέ[νθος] ματρί πολυθρηνήτω κάλλιπες Αρπαλίδι. δώμα δ’ Αριστάνδροιο λελονχότος άκριτον αί[σαν] και τέκεα κρυερά θήκας εν ορφανία. Αγήνος κλυτόν αίμα, σε δ’ ύστατον ύπνον ελο[ύσαν]. πικρός  όδε ζοφερά τύμβος έδεκτ[ο κόνει]. approximately translated as: "Greetings Philistion. You went twenty three years old in the underworld and left your mother Arpalis in mourning, your husband Aristandros widower and confused, and the children cold as orphans. [You], the glorious blood of Agenos, having chosen for yourself the last sleep, this bitter, pitch-dark tomb has accepted you [in the dust]."
The terracotta statuettes of Artemis. They were found in large quantities in the small temple of Artemis at Kanoni in Corfu city.
Four cases with coins found in excavations at various sites of Corfu.
On 15 October 2010, the museum was closed for works. It is now reopened.
The Stele of Arniadas

Museum exhibits

Citations and notes

External links 

New York Times review of the Archaeological Museum of Corfu
Corfu Archaeological Museum from the Internet archive
Corfu Archaeological Museum from the Greek Ministry of Culture website

See also 
 List of museums in Greece

Corfu
Museums in Corfu
Buildings and structures in Corfu (city)